Prionodera is a genus of leaf beetles in the subfamily Eumolpinae. It is known from Central and South America.

Species
 Prionodera adiastola Flowers, 2004
 Prionodera arimanes Flowers, 2004
 Prionodera bicolor (Olivier, 1808)
 Prionodera bicolor bicolor (Olivier, 1808)
 Prionodera bicolor tenuepunctata  Bechyné, 1950
 Prionodera costata (Baly, 1859)
 Prionodera cyanea (Lefèvre, 1884)
 Prionodera dichroma Flowers, 2004
 Prionodera esmeralda Flowers, 2004
 Prionodera furcada Flowers, 2004
 Prionodera gaiophanes Flowers, 2004
 Prionodera geniculata (Baly, 1859)
 Prionodera kirschi (Lefèvre, 1877)
 Prionodera lutea Erichson, 1847
 Prionodera marshalli Lefèvre, 1884
 Prionodera merana Bechyné, 1950 (Synonym: Jodasia roseometallica Bechyné, 1953)
 Prionodera nila Flowers, 2004
 Prionodera peruviana (Bechyné, 1951)

The following species have been moved to other genera:
 Prionodera chloroptera Germar, 1824: moved to Metaxyonycha
 Prionodera nixa Bechyné, 1953: moved to Prionoderita
 Prionodera ocanana Lefèvre, 1878: moved to Metaxyonycha

References

Eumolpinae
Chrysomelidae genera
Beetles of Central America
Beetles of South America